The 2020–21 Arizona State Sun Devils men's basketball team represented Arizona State University during the 2020–21 NCAA Division I men's basketball season. The Sun Devils are led by sixth-year head coach Bobby Hurley, and played their home games at Desert Financial Arena in Tempe, Arizona as members of the Pac–12 Conference.

Previous season
The Sun Devils finished the season 20–11, 11–7 in Pac-12 play to finish in a tie for third place. They were set to take on Washington State in the quarterfinals of the Pac-12 tournament. However, the remainder of the tournament, and all other postseason tournaments, were cancelled amid the COVID-19 pandemic.

Off-season

Departures

Incoming transfers

2020 recruiting class

2021 Recruiting class

Roster

Schedule and results

|-
!colspan=12 style=| Regular season

|-
!colspan=12 style=| Pac-12 tournament

|-

Source:

Rankings

*AP does not release post-NCAA Tournament rankings.^Coaches did not release a Week 1 poll.

References

Arizona State Sun Devils men's basketball seasons
Arizona State
Arizona State Sun Devils men's basketball
Arizona State Sun Devils men's basketball